
Gmina Wyryki is a rural gmina (administrative district) in Włodawa County, Lublin Voivodeship, in eastern Poland.

Villages
Gmina Wyryki contains the villages and settlements of Adampol, Horostyta, Horostyta-Kolonia, Ignaców, Kaplonosy, Kaplonosy-Kolonia, Krzywowierzba, Lipówka, Lubień, Siedliska, Suchawa, Wyryki, Wyryki-Adampol, Wyryki-Wola, Zahajki and Zahajki-Kolonia.

Neighbouring gminas
Gmina Wyryki is bordered by the town of Włodawa and by the gminas of Dębowa Kłoda, Hanna, Hańsk, Podedwórze, Sosnówka, Stary Brus and Włodawa.

References
Polish official population figures 2006

Wyryki
Włodawa County